Youth Will Be Served is a 1940 American musical film directed by Otto Brower and starring Jane Withers and Jane Darwell.

Plot
A southern girl (Withers) goes to a National Youth Association camp after her father goes to jail for bootlegging. When a mean tycoon tries to buy the campground for himself, she stages a show that endears her to him. When her father escapes and catches the crooks who took the tycoon's money, all is saved.

Cast
 Jane Withers as Eadie-May
 Jane Darwell as Supervisor Stormer
 Joe Brown Jr. as Benjy
 Robert Conway as Dr. Bob
 Elyse Knox as Pamela
 John Qualen as Clem Howie
 Charles Holland as Ephraim
 Lillian Porter as Lisbeth
 Clara Blandick as Miss Bradshaw
 Tully Marshall as Rufus Britt
 Richard Lane as Mr. Hewitt

References

External links
Youth Will Be Served at the Internet Movie Database

1940 films
American musical films
1940 musical films
Films directed by Otto Brower
American black-and-white films
Films with screenplays by Wanda Tuchock
20th Century Fox films
1940s American films